The Policing and Crime Act 2017 (c. 3) is an omnibus act of the Parliament of the United Kingdom. It received royal assent on 31 January 2017.

Synopsis

The act enacts various changes to existing rules involving PCCs, complaints through the IPCC, amendments to PACE 1984 etc.

PCSOs
One notable change involves the expansion of powers to police staff and introduces voluntary police community support officers (PCSOs). It is also expands the powers of a PCSO to "any power or duty of a constable, other than a power or duty specified in Part 1 of Schedule 3B (excluded powers and duties)". Part 6 of the act brings clarity to the classifying guns under the Firearms Act 1968, based on recommendations from the Law Commission.

Police bail procedure

Another change relates to police bail, which can now only be authorised by an officer of inspector rank or higher (so normally a suspect will now be released without bail if not charged), and extending this period is now only possible once by authorisation of a superintendent officer, or again by a magistrates' court; previously it was possible for police to effectively restrain a person indefinitely by extending the bail period every 28 days. Controversially this has led police forces to adopt an alternative method of 'release under investigation' (RUI) with no time limits or conditions, requiring a suspect to respond by post.

In December 2020, Her Majesty's Inspectorate of Constabulary and Fire & Rescue Services released a report on RUI.

In November 2017, Hertfordshire Constabulary released under the Freedom of Information Act 2000 a copy of the template RUI form used by them.

Alan Turing law
The Act also offers a pardon to men convicted for homosexual acts that are no longer considered criminal offences. This is sometimes informally referred to as the Alan Turing law, named for Alan Turing, the mathematician and World War II codebreaker, who was convicted of gross indecency in 1952.

See also
Policing and Crime Act 2009
Police Reform Act 2002

References

External links
Policing and Crime Act 2017, as enacted

Law enforcement in the United Kingdom
United Kingdom Acts of Parliament 2017
Statutory law
 
Imprisonment and detention